Ryan Adam Pallotta (born March 17, 1985) is a Canadian music video director.

External links
 Official Web Site
 

Canadian music video directors
Living people
1985 births
21st-century Canadian people